Sandia Resort & Casino is a casino and hotel complex on the Sandia Pueblo reservation near Albuquerque, New Mexico. It includes  of gaming space, an outdoor amphitheater, and a convention center.

The casino has more than 1,750 slot machines.

History

The casino opened in 2001. In 2005, a 7-story hotel was added, also an 18-hole golf course and a spa.

See also
 List of casinos in New Mexico

References

External links 

Casinos in New Mexico
Native American casinos
Hotel buildings completed in 2005
Casinos completed in 2001
2001 establishments in New Mexico
Native American history of New Mexico